Estoy vivo is a Spanish crime television series with supernatural and comedy elements. Created by Daniel Écija and produced by RTVE in collaboration with Globomedia and Good Mood, it premiered on 7 September 2017 on La 1. Its fourth season premiered on 10 March 2021.

Premise 
Andrés Vargas (Roberto Álamo), a police officer, dies during the pursuit of a serial killer. Given a second chance, he comes back to life, but 5 years after his death is incarnated into the body of another police officer, Manuel Márquez (Javier Gutiérrez). He teams up with Vargas' daughter Susana (Anna Castillo), who does not suspect Márquez's real identity, and with 'El Enlace' (Alejo Sauras) in facing the killer, who has resumed their activity.

The show is set in Vallecas, Madrid, though other locations of the Spanish capital also appear in the series.

Cast 
First season
 Javier Gutiérrez as Manuel Márquez.
 Anna Castillo as Susana.
  as David Aranda.
 Alejo Sauras as El Enlace.
 Cristina Plazas as Laura.
 Zorion Eguileor as Arturo.
 Fele Martínez as Óscar Santos.
  as María.
  as Sebastián Rey.
 Lucía Caraballo as Bea.
 Mon Ceballos as El Carnicero de Medianoche.
 Roberto Álamo as Andrés Vargas.
 Julia Gutiérrez Caba as the zone's director (special collaboration).
Introduced in season 2
  as Lola.
 Artur Busquets as Palacios.
 Ana Marzoa.
 Laura Quirós as Ángela.
Introduced in season 3
 Aitana Sánchez-Gijón as Verónica.
 Jan Cornet as Adrián.
 Laia Manzanares as Carlota.
  as Alicia.
 Irene Rojo as Rebe.
Introduced in season 4
  as Adriana.
 Almagro San Miguel as Mikel.
 Pablo Vázquez as Landa.

Production and release 
Filming of the first season began in June 2017 in Madrid.

The first episode was aired on La 1 on 7 September 2017.

In December 2017, Amazon purchased the rights for the distribution of the series in Spain and Latin America as part of its SVoD service.

The renovation of the series for a second season was announced in December 2017.

The renovation for a third season was confirmed in April 2019.

The fourth season was confirmed in February 2020. Filming was wrapped up in February 2021. Comprising 13 episodes, it premiered on 10 March 2021.

Season 1

Season 2

Season 3

Season 4

Accolades 

|-
| rowspan = 6 align = "center" | 2017
| 64th Ondas Awards 
| 
| Javier Gutiérrez
| 
| align = "center" | 
|-
| rowspan = 5 | 5th 
| colspan = 2 | Best Drama Series
| 
| align = "center" rowspan = "5" | 
|-
| colspan = "2" | Best Direction
| 
|-
| colspan = "2" | Best Screenplay
| 
|-
| Best Drama Actor
| Javier Gutiérrez
| 
|-
| Best Drama Actress
| Anna Castillo
| 
|-
| rowspan = 8 align = "center" | 2018
| rowspan = 2 | 5th Feroz Awards
| colspan = 2 | Best Drama Series
| 
| align = "center" rowspan = "2" | 
|-
| Best Supporting Actor in a TV Series
| Alejo Sauras
| 
|-
| 68th Fotogramas de Plata
| Best TV Actor
| Alejo Sauras
| 
| align = "center" | 
|-
| 27th Actors and Actresses Union Awards
| Best New Actor
| Mon Ceballos
| 
| align = "center" | 
|-
| rowspan = "3" | 20th Iris Awards
| colspan = "2" | Best Fiction ||  || rowspan = "3" | 
|-
| Best Actor || Javier Gutiérrez ||  
|-
| Best Screenplay || Daniel Écija, Jesús Mesas, Guillermo Cisneros,Jon de la Cuesta, Federico Muñoz, Andrés Martín,Guillermo Clua, Jaime Palacios, Mercedes Cruz& Adriana Rivas || 
|-
| 6th MiM Series Awards 
| Best Drama Actress
| Cristina Plazas
| 
| align = "center" | 
|-
| align = "center" rowspan = "2" | 2019
| rowspan = "2" | 28th Actors and Actresses Union Awards
| Best Lead Actor (TV)
| Javier Gutiérrez
| 
| rowspan = "2" align = "center" | 
|-
| Best Supporting Actor (TV)
| Alejo Sauras
| 
|-
| align = "center" rowspan = "4" | 2020
| rowspan = "4" | 29th Actors and Actresses Union Awards
| Best Lead Actor (TV)
| Javier Gutiérrez
| 
| align = "center" rowspan = "4" | 
|-
| Best Supporting Actor (TV)
| Alejo Sauras
| 
|-
| Best Actress in a Minor Role (TV)
| Goizalde Núñez
| 
|-
| Best Actor in a Minor Role (TV)
| Jesús Castejón
| 
|-
| align = "center" | 2022 || 30th Actors and Actresses Union Awards || Best Television Actor in a Secondary Role || Alfonso Bassave ||  || 
|}

References

External links 
 Estoy vivo on RTVE Play

Television shows filmed in Spain
2010s Spanish drama television series
2020s Spanish drama television series
2017 Spanish television series debuts
La 1 (Spanish TV channel) network series
Television shows set in Madrid
Spanish fantasy television series
Spanish-language television shows
2010s supernatural television series
2020s supernatural television series
Television series set in the 2010s
Television series by Globomedia
Television series by Good Mood